Hastatis is a genus of longhorn beetles of the subfamily Lamiinae.

 Hastatis auricollis Buquet, 1857
 Hastatis denticollis Buquet, 1857
 Hastatis femoralis Burmeister, 1865
 Hastatis simplicis Galileo & Martins, 1990

References

Calliini